Albert Woody Austin II (born January 27, 1964) is an American professional golfer who played the majority of his career on the PGA Tour, but now plays on the PGA Tour Champions.

Austin was born in Tampa, Florida. He attended the University of Miami, where he was a member of the golf team coached by Norman C. Parsons Jr. He graduated in 1986 with a degree in Business Administration and turned professional later that year.

Austin won PGA Tour Rookie of the Year honors in 1995. He has won four times on tour: the 1995 Buick Open, the 2004 Buick Championship, the 2007 Stanford St. Jude Championship shooting a final round 62, and the 2013 Sanderson Farms Championship (where he became the 8th oldest winner in Tour history, just younger than Raymond Floyd).

During the 1997 Verizon Heritage, Austin intentionally struck his head with his putter five times. He hit his head so hard that the shaft bent.

After the second round of the 2007 PGA Championship, Austin joked that he was named after actor Woody Harrelson (Harrelson being only three years older than Austin). He went on to finish 2nd behind Tiger Woods, his best major finish. This achievement moved Austin into the top 50 of the Official World Golf Rankings. Austin's career high ranking was 29th in 2008. During the 2007 Presidents Cup, Austin fell into a pond while attempting to hit a shot with one foot in the water. This incident led to Woody's nickname "Aquaman". During his singles match against 2007 U.S. Open Champion Ángel Cabrera, he wore a pair of swimming goggles.

After struggling for years with limited PGA Tour status as a past champion, Austin won the 2013 Sanderson Farms Championship, his first PGA Tour win in six years. In that season's PGA Championship, Austin was given a four-stroke penalty for having fifteen clubs in his bag; he would miss the cut by one stroke. Although Austin didn't do well enough to earn entry into the FedEx Cup (137th after making two cuts in eight events, plus the win was an alternate event only worth 300 FedEx Cup points rather than 500), his win earned him a tour card through 2015. Despite his exemption, Austin decided to focus on the PGA Tour Champions.

In March 2016, Austin won his maiden title on the PGA Tour Champions with a one stroke victory at the Tucson Conquistadores Classic; he followed that victory up with two additional PGA Tour Champions wins in 2016. On October 21, 2018, Austin won the Dominion Energy Charity Classic. Austin closed with a three-under-par 69 on a cool day to record his fourth senior victory, but first since 2016. The tournament was held at the Country Club of Virginia in Richmond, Virginia.

Austin was inducted into the University of Miami Sports Hall of Fame at its 40th Annual Banquet held February 13, 2008 at Miami's Jungle Island. He resides in Derby, Kansas.

Professional wins (10)

PGA Tour wins (4)

PGA Tour playoff record (3–1)

Other wins (2)
1993 Waterloo Open Golf Classic
2007 Merrill Lynch Shootout (with Mark Calcavecchia)

PGA Tour Champions wins (4)

PGA Tour Champions playoff record (1–2)

Other senior wins (1)
2017 Diamond Resorts Invitational

Playoff record
Nike Tour playoff record (0–1)

Results in major championships

CUT = missed the halfway cut
"T" indicates a tie for a place.

Summary

Most consecutive cuts made – 6 (2003 U.S. Open – 2006 PGA)
Longest streak of top-10s – 1

Results in The Players Championship

CUT = missed the halfway cut
"T" indicates a tie for a place

Results in World Golf Championships

QF, R16, R32, R64 = Round in which player lost in match play
"T" = tied

Results in senior major championships
Results not in chronological order before 2022.

CUT = missed the halfway cut
"T" indicates a tie for a place
NT = No tournament due to COVID-19 pandemic

U.S. national team appearances
Presidents Cup: 2007 (winners)

See also
1994 PGA Tour Qualifying School graduates
1998 Nike Tour graduates
2002 PGA Tour Qualifying School graduates

References

External links

University of Miami Sports Hall of Fame

American male golfers
Miami Hurricanes men's golfers
PGA Tour golfers
PGA Tour Champions golfers
Korn Ferry Tour graduates
Golfers from Tampa, Florida
People from Derby, Kansas
1964 births
Living people